Darius Haili is a Papua New Guinean former professional rugby league footballer who played for the Papua New Guinea Kumuls at five-eighth. He scored two tries against the New Zealand national rugby league team in 1986 in Port Moresby in the Kumuls first ever victory over the Kiwis.

References

Papua New Guinean rugby league players
Papua New Guinean sportsmen
Papua New Guinea national rugby league team players
Rugby league five-eighths
Possibly living people
Year of birth missing